Arttu Luttinen (born September 3, 1983) is a Finnish professional ice hockey forward who currently plays for HIFK of the Liiga. He was selected by the Ottawa Senators in the 3rd round (75th overall) of the 2002 NHL Entry Draft.

Career statistics

References

External links

1983 births
Living people
Binghamton Senators players
Espoo Blues players
HIFK (ice hockey) players
Ottawa Senators draft picks
Lahti Pelicans players
Ice hockey people from Helsinki
Finnish ice hockey left wingers